Ottokar Lorenz (17 September 1832 – 13 May 1904) was an Austrian-German historian and genealogist. He was born in Iglau (now Jihlava, Czech Republic) and died in Jena. He was the father of chemist Richard Lorenz (1863-1929).

He studied philology, history and philosophy in Vienna, where his instructors included Hermann Bonitz, Joseph Aschbach and Albert Jäger. From 1861 to 1885, Lorenz was a professor of history at the University of Vienna, being appointed rector in 1880. Afterwards, he was a professor at the University of Jena.

He was a founder of modern "scientific genealogy". Some of his better written efforts are as follows:
 Deutsche Geschichte im 13. und 14. Jahrhundert, ("German history in the 13th and 14th centuries"), two volumes (1863–67).
 Drei Bücher Geschichte (1876; 2nd ed., 1879) (Three books of History). 
 , two volumes, 1886–87.
 Geschichte des Elsasses, ("History of Alsace"); with Wilhelm Scherer, 3rd edition 1886.
 Genealogisches Handbuch der europäischen Staatengeschichte, ("Genealogical textbook of European states history"), (1892).
 Lehrbuch der wissenschaftlichen Genealogie, ("Textbook of scientific genealogy"), (1898).

References 
 Ottokar Lorenz @ AEIOU Encyclopedia

External links 
 Genealogy and human heredity in Germany around 1900
 OnLine Books Page bibliography

19th-century German historians
Academic staff of the University of Vienna
Academic staff of the University of Jena
1832 births
1904 deaths
German male non-fiction writers